Tobakochi Dam  is a gravity dam located in Mie Prefecture in Japan. The dam is used for flood control. The catchment area of the dam is 11.6 km2. The dam impounds about 33  ha of land when full and can store 2960 thousand cubic meters of water. The construction of the dam was started on 1975.

See also
List of dams in Japan

References

Dams in Mie Prefecture